Secret of the Old Clock is the 12th installment in the Nancy Drew point-and-click adventure game series by Her Interactive. The game is available for play on Microsoft Windows platforms. It has an ESRB rating of E for moments of mild violence and peril. Players take on the first-person view of fictional amateur sleuth Nancy Drew and must solve the mystery through interrogation of suspects, solving puzzles, and discovering clues. There are two levels of gameplay, Junior and Senior detective modes, each offering a different difficulty level of puzzles and hints, however neither of these changes affect the actual plot of the game. The game was created to commemorate the 75th anniversary of Nancy Drew's creation. It is based on the first four Nancy Drew books ever published: The Secret of the Old Clock, The Hidden Staircase, The Bungalow Mystery, and The Mystery at Lilac Inn.

Plot
The game is set in 1930, at the beginning of the Great Depression in the small fictional town of Titusville, Illinois. Nancy Drew has been asked to come to the Lilac Inn to see Emily Crandall, whom Nancy knows only through a mutual friend. Emily's mother died a month ago, leaving her to run the inn with the help of her guardian, Jane Willoughby. Emily and her mother had been counting on the generosity of their kindly but strange neighbor, Josiah Crowley, to leave them part of his estate to support the inn they own. But in his will, everything was left to Richard Topham, his ESP teacher. When Nancy arrives at the inn, she encounters a mystery involving stolen jewels, a missing will, car chases, and plenty of adventure.

Development

Characters
Nancy Drew - Nancy is an 18-year-old amateur detective from the fictional town of River Heights in the United States. She is the only playable character in the game, which means the player must solve the mystery from her perspective.
Emily Crandall - 17-year-old Emily runs the Lilac Inn with the help of her guardian, Jane, while quietly mourning the recent loss of her mother. She is plagued by strange occurrences - objects on the wall move, whispers call from the shadows, and things mysteriously disappear and then reappear, she says. Could she be just paranoid, or is she guilty of something?
Jane Willoughby - Gloria Crandall, Emily's mother, asked Jane to look after her daughter in case anything happened to her. Jane's doing her best to help Emily, but she doesn't know much about raising kids or running an inn. Jane is trying to convince Emily to sell the inn and split the profits with her. Could Jane have a hidden agenda?
Richard Topham - A self-proclaimed expert on ESP, Richard Topham lives near the Lilac Inn, in the house that once belonged to Josiah Crowley. It now serves as Topham's "School for the Study and Development of Paranormal Powers". Topham was the one to inherit Josiah's estate and money, even though Josiah told Emily that she and her mother would be included in his will. How did Topham come to inherit Josiah's estate?
Jim Archer - Jim Archer is a good-natured, but secretly desperate, businessman who is trying to make it through the Great Depression. Although he's always smiling, the bank he owns is teetering on the brink of failure. Would he forge a will, or steal Emily's mother's jewels, just to save his bank?

Cast
Nancy Drew - Lani Minella
Carson Drew - Dennis Regan
Jane Willoughby - Sarah Papineau
Emily Crandall - Walayn Sharples
Richard Topham / Additional Voices - Tim Moore
Jim Archer - Ben Laurance
Mrs. O'Shea / Additional Voices - Amy Broomhall
Miss Jakowski / Additional Voices - Megan Hill
Mr. Phelps / Additional Voices - Chris Spott
Tubby Telegram Guy / Additional Voices - Jonah von Spreekin
Bess Marvin - Alisa Murray
George Fayne - Patty Pomplun
Uri the Cat - Cory the Cat

Reception
According to review aggregation website Metacritic, Secret of the Old Clock received "generally favorable reviews" from critics. Charles Herold of The New York Times called Secret of the Old Clock "pleasant but inconsequential", and noted that it was "one of the shortest and easiest games in the series".

References

2005 video games
Detective video games
Video games based on Nancy Drew
Point-and-click adventure games
Video games developed in the United States
Video games scored by Kevin Manthei
Video games set in Illinois
Video games set in 1930
Windows games
Windows-only games
Fiction set in 1930
Her Interactive games
Single-player video games
North America-exclusive video games